Melanophora is a genus of woodlouse flies in the family Rhinophoridae. There are five described species in Melanophora.

Species
These five species belong to the genus Melanophora:
 Melanophora argyriventris (Curran, 1929)
 Melanophora asetosa Kugler, 1978
 Melanophora basilewskyi (Peris, 1957)
 Melanophora chia Cerretti & Pape, 2009
 Melanophora roralis (Linnaeus, 1758)

References

Further reading

 

Rhinophoridae
Articles created by Qbugbot
Schizophora genera